The following are the national records in Olympic weightlifting in Laos. Records are maintained in each weight class for the snatch lift, clean and jerk lift, and the total for both lifts by the Lao Weightlifting Federation.

Men

Women

References

Laos
records
weightlifting